Severe Tropical Cyclone Magda was a relatively small tropical cyclone that brought minor damage to parts of Western Australia in January 2010. The third named storm of the 2009–10 Australian region cyclone season, Magda originated from a tropical low near the Indonesian island of Roti on 18 January. Quickly strengthening, the system attained tropical cyclone status on 20 January and later reached severe tropical cyclone intensity on 21 January as it approached Western Australia. Late on 21 January, Magda made landfall in the Kimberley region with winds of  before quickly weakening over land. The remnants of Magda persisted until 24 January, at which time they dissipated east of Port Hedland.

Prior to Cyclone Magda's arrival, several severe weather warnings were issued for the coastline of Western Australia. The most severe damage was defoliation around Kuri Bay. Following its usage, the name Magda was retired and replaced with Megan.

Meteorological history

Severe Tropical Cyclone Magda originated from a tropical low that was first identified by the Australian Bureau of Meteorology (BOM) on 18 January 2010 near the Indonesian island of Roti. Initially situated in a weak steering environment, the low drifted towards the southwest and gradually gained intensity. The following day, the Joint Typhoon Warning Center (JTWC) also began monitoring the system. Throughout 19 January, a developing low-level circulation showed improved organisation, feature deep convection over its centre. Atmospheric conditions in the region favoured further development, featuring low to moderate wind shear. A trough situated near the coast of Western Australia aided in improving the low's outflow. Later that day, the JTWC issued a Tropical Cyclone Formation Alert on the system; they expected the low to intensify into a tropical cyclone within the following 24 hours.

Early on 20 January, the BOM upgraded the low to a tropical cyclone, at which time it was given the name Magda. However, there is uncertainty whether the system actually obtained this strength or if it strengthened hours later. At the time of the upgrade, Magda featured deep convection over its centre, but banding features extended a little more than halfway around the circulation. Later that day, the small cyclone underwent a period of rapid intensification as an eye feature became apparent in satellite imagery. In response to an approaching trough, Magda tracked towards the southeast. Around 2100 UTC, the JTWC issued their first advisory on Magda, designating it as Tropical Cyclone 08S. Over the following several hours, the eye feature became increasingly defined, allowing the storm to intensify into a severe tropical cyclone by 0000 UTC on 21 January. However, shear abruptly increased hours later, causing the low-level circulation of Magda to become displaced from the deepest convection.

As the storm continued to near landfall in Australia, it re-intensified as deep convection redeveloped over its centre, combined with the formation of an eye. Around 1800 UTC on 21 January, Magda was classified as a severe tropical cyclone for the second time. Within hours of reattaining severe tropical cyclone status, Magda passed over Augustus Island. Further uncertainty in the storm's peak intensity exists through data from AMSU and CIMSS which estimated peak one-minute sustained winds of  respectively.

The system made its second landfall near Kuri Bay, a remote area in the Kimberley region, at peak strength before it began to weaken. Later that day, Magda passed directly over the town of Derby, where winds were measured under gale-force. This prompted the BOM to downgrade the system to a tropical low. Once the trough which initially steered Magda into Western Australia relaxed, the system slowly turned towards the south-southwest before fully dissipating early on 24 January east of Port Hedland.

Preparations and impact
As Cyclone Magda approached the Western Australian coastline, severe weather warnings were issued for parts of the Kimberley region. A mining company, working in Mount Gibson on Koolan Island, evacuated 228 employees due to the threat of the cyclone. However, 64 members of an emergency crew would remain behind in a cyclone shelter. Hours before the storm made landfall, a red alert, the highest level of storm alert, was issued for areas around where the storm was expected to move onshore. The State Emergency Service warned that all residents around Kuri Bay "need to go to shelter immediately." Most of the alerts remained in place until Magda weakened to a tropical low on 22 January.

Although Magda made landfall as a severe tropical cyclone, it struck a sparsely populated region. A few homes around Kuri Bay sustained roof damage, but no injuries were reported. Although damage in relation to Magda was limited, its name was retired following its usage and was later replaced with Megan.

See also

2009–10 Australian region cyclone season
Timeline of the 2009–10 Australian region cyclone season

References

External links

 Joint Typhoon Warning Center (JTWC) 
 Australian Bureau of Meteorology (TCWC's Perth, Darwin & Brisbane) 

Category 3 Australian region cyclones
2010 disasters in Australia
2009–10 Australian region cyclone season
Retired Australian region cyclones
Tropical cyclones in 2010